The Eight Cold Hells (八寒地獄; Japanese: hakkan-jigoku) as opposed to the Eight Hot Hells are part of Buddhist eschatology. They are said to lie under the continent of Jambudvipa next to the eight hot hells but outside the boundary of the eight great hells. Residents of these hells are tormented by unbearable cold.

According to the Nirvana Sutra, they are 
 the Hahava hell, 
 the Atata hell, 
 the Alalahell, 
 the Ababa hell, 
 the Utpala hell (the hell of the blue lotus), 
 the Padma hell (the hell of the crimson lotus), 
 the Kumuda hell (the hell of the scarlet lotus), 
 the Pundarika (the hell of the white lotus).

The first four names reflect the cries uttered by sufferers in these hells because of the intolerable cold. The latter four hells are named for the changes one's flesh is said to undergo when exposed to the intense cold there. For instance, in the hell of the crimson lotus the cold is said to be so severe that one's back breaks open and bloody flesh emerges, resembling a crimson lotus flower.

According to the Dharma Analysis Treasury, the eight cold hells are 
 the Arbuda hell (the hell of chilblains), 
 the Nirarbuda hell (the hell of enlarged chilblains), 
 the Atata hell, 
 the Hahava hell, 
 the Huhuva hell, 
 the Utpala hell (the hell of the blue lotus), 
 the Padma hell (the hell of the crimson lotus), 
 the Mahapadma hell (the hell of the great crimson lotus).

In the first hell, the intense cold produces chilblains all over one's body. In the second hell, one's chilblains worsen and finally burst. The following three hells are named for the shrieks of sufferers who inhabit them. In the sixth hell, one's flesh turns blue from the intense cold. In the last two hells, the cold makes one's flesh crack open, resembling a crimson lotus.

References 

Naraka